Cartesian Reflections is a 2008 book by the philosopher John Cottingham. The work consists of several essays that deal with diverse topics, such as René Descartes's views of animals, his position on the dualism of mind and body and the relation between his thoughts and those of Baruch Spinoza.

Reviews
Review in Notre Dame Philosophical Reviews 8 (L. Alanen)
Review in Logical Analysis and History of Philosophy 14, pp. 203–209 (J. Doomen)
Review in the Review of Metaphysics 63, pp. 180–182 (W. Jaworski)
Review in French Studies 64, pp. 83, 84 (M. Moriarty)

External links
 Publisher's website

2008 non-fiction books
Books about René Descartes
Books by John Cottingham
Contemporary philosophical literature
English-language books
Oxford University Press books
Philosophy books